Labarrus hoabinhensis, is a species of dung beetle found throughout the Oriental Region from the countries Bhutan, India, Nepal, Philippines, Sri Lanka, Thailand and Vietnam.

References 

Scarabaeidae
Insects of Sri Lanka
Beetles described in 1946